How I Met Your Music is the name of two albums  (the first being followed by the subtitle Original Songs from the Hit Series "How I Met Your Mother", the second being followed by Deluxe) composed of songs from the CBS television series How I Met Your Mother, the first of which was released hours before the Season 8 premiere. It features 20 songs that had appeared in the first seven seasons of the show and was released only digitally, originally through iTunes.  A second iteration, titled How I Met Your Music: Deluxe album, was released a year later.  It contains an entirely different play list.  Many critics have said that the albums reflect the series' consistently effective use of music.

Show soundtrack summaries
Critics have often commented on the series' "thoughtful" use of music.  As Rolling Stone noted:
Maybe you liked the show's soundtrack better than its 'surprise' ending? It may have gotten lost in all the meeting-the-mother mythology, catchphrases, slaps and recurring gags, but How I Met Your Mother was an incredibly musically-minded sitcom... the show had some truly catchy original tunes, ranging from teen pop... to show tunes... to death metal... . If that weren't enough, HIMYM has also been incredibly adept at matching great scenes with great songs.

One critic said the show makes "flawless" music choices that meld with the story.  Jessica Blankenship wrote that the show's writers seamlessly "use a song as a punchline, a bridge, or an emotional punctuation mark."  It was a hallmark of the series.

In 9 seasons (208 episodes), at least 408 songs were used.

Viewers report that the soundtrack varies depending upon forums and media.  It is claimed there is a significant discontinuity in the songs that were originally used, the DVD version, and the Netflix versions of the show.

The 100th episode was dubbed "How I Met Your Musical", which presaged the albums' names.

The albums
The very concept of "best" songs from the series is problematic as the many lists of 'iconic' songs vary.

The first album contained about 20 tracks totaling 40 minutes. According to Craig Thomas, a co-creator of How I Met Your Mother, a decision was made to release it without a physical CD, "because that’s so 1992".
Entitled How I Met Your Music: Original Songs from the Hit Series, it was originally released digitally to iTunes in 2012, and featured songs from the first seven seasons of the show.

Following the show's end, a second album, How I Met Your Music: Deluxe, was released digitally via iTunes in 2014.  It features songs from the final two seasons.  One review says it contains 14 of the "most memorable songs of the nine seasons of the series."  It includes various actors/artists as performers: Boyz II Men, Wayne Brady,  Frances Conroy, Alyson Hannigan, Neil Patrick Harris, John Lithgow, Sam Moore,  Cristin Milioti, Jason Segel,  Cobie Smulders, The Solids,  John Swihart, and Ben Vereen.

Track listing

Charts

References

Notes

Citations

2012 soundtrack albums
Television soundtracks
How I Met Your Mother